Chearsley is a village and civil parish within the Buckinghamshire district in the ceremonial county of Buckinghamshire, England. It is situated about seven miles south west of Aylesbury, and about four miles north of Thame, in Oxfordshire.

History
The village was mentioned in the Domesday Book of 1086 as Cerdeslai. It was originally a hamlet in the nearby parish of Crendon. It was established as a parish in its own right by the Bishop of Lincoln in 1458.

Etymology
The village name is Anglo Saxon in origin, and means 'Cerdic's clearing' or 'Cerdic's lea'.

Elite personal names
The incidence of Brittonic personal names in the royal genealogies of a number of "Anglo-Saxon" dynasties is significant. The Wessex royal line was traditionally founded by a man named Cerdic, an undoubtedly Brittonic name ultimately derived from Caratacus. This may indicate that Cerdic was a native Briton, and that his dynasty became anglicised over time.

Notability
The village was used as a location in the television series Midsomer Murders – ep. Country Matters, ITV.

References

Gallery

External links
 The Chearsley Times – village information
 Images at Geograph.com

Villages in Buckinghamshire
Civil parishes in Buckinghamshire